Dieter Rubach (born 28 April 1955 in Solingen) is a German bass player, composer, engineer and producer.

Life and career 

In the early 1970s, Rubach joined the heavy metal band Accept, first on keyboards, later on bass until he left in 1978 and was succeeded by Peter Baltes. In 1983, after leaving the German pop band Lichtblick, he formed his own hard rock band Bad Steve, along with other ex-Accept members like Frank Friedrich and Jan Koemmet, who left the band after their albums Breaker and Restless And Wild. Rumors and pictures say that 3 other Accept members (Jörg Fischer, Stefan Kaufmann and Hansi Heitzer) also played with Bad Steve.

In 1985, they released the album Killing The Night (produced by Alphaville's producer Wolfgang Loos), including the single Across The Rainbow, where a video was shot. They also supported Accept for a 1984 tour. It was the band's only album, before they split. It showcased Rubach as a songwriter and guitarist too.→

When lead singer Udo Dirkschneider left Accept in 1987, he formed his own band called U.D.O., recorded the album Animal House and asked Rubach for a brief stint in his touring band. The tour started in early February 1988 and U.D.O. played in Hungary, Germany, Norway, Denmark, Belgium, Netherlands, UK, France, Finland, US and Canada. Rubach appears on several bootlegs, as well as on a RTL TV special called "MOSH". They also did a tour with Guns N' Roses, Zodiac Mindwarp and Lita Ford (where he met his old friend Martin Gerschwitz again) before he left the band in 1989.

Rubach continued to work as a session musician and arranger for famous German acts like Anne Haigis and Nino de Angelo. As a bandmember he also recorded with Scholle & his Friends, Melo Mafali, Eisenhertz, Lothar und die Trabanten and many more.

In the new millennium he was part of Martin Gerschwitz & Friends. They also shot a DVD at the SAE, Frankfurt in 2004, before he left the band and continued to record and perform with German bands The Pirates of Love, Funky Frank, Justin Nova and others.

As an audio engineer he worked for many artists like Scorpions, Elton John, Bonnie Tyler, Whitney Houston, Lionel Richie, Joe Cocker, Luciano Pavarotti, Iggy Pop, Pet Shop Boys, Chris de Burgh, Chris Rea, Art Garfunkel, Muddy Waters, Paul Young, Kelly Family, Electric Light Orchestra, Ace of Base, Miguel Rios, Billy Cobham, Helge Schneider, Rednex, Milva, Tato Gomez, Karel Gott, The United Jazz and Rock Ensemble, Supermax, Leningrad Cowboys, Angelika Milster, Baden Powell de Aquino, Grobschnitt, Tarkan, Beverly Craven, Andre Heller, Vaya Con Dios, Eleni Tzoka and for the musicals Jesus Christ Superstar, Cabaret, The Magic Flute and The Jungle Book. He also worked as a roadie, stage technician and light operator. He also recorded albums with Gil Scott-Heron, Rufus Thomas, Bourbon $treet and Irek Dudek. He owns a recording studio in Mannheim, Germany, Para-Studio.

Under a pseudonym he wrote several songs for the Eurovision Song Contest.

Discography 

 1982 – Lichtblick – Lichtblick '82
 1985 – Bad Steve – Killing The Night
 1991 – Lothar und die Trabanten – Unter dem Wartburg

As sound engineer 

 1990 – Gil Scott-Heron – Tales of Gil Scott-Heron
 1990 – Ozo – In the Threshold of Jain
 1992 – Rufus Thomas – Timeless Funk
 1992 – Anne Haigis – Cry Wolf
 1992 – Melo Mafali – Babylons Acumen
 1995 – Aida – Presents Mythos
 1997 – Bourbon $treet – Live on the Rocks
 2000 – Bourbon $treet – Straight Up Rock'n Roll

DVD 

 2003 – U.D.O. – Nailed To Metal (Compilation) GER: #100
 2004 – Martin Gerschwitz & Friends – Live in Frankfurt

References

External links
 

German male musicians
German heavy metal musicians
German heavy metal bass guitarists
Male bass guitarists
German record producers
German audio engineers
People from Solingen
Living people
1955 births
Accept (band) members
U.D.O. members
Engineers from North Rhine-Westphalia
German male guitarists